Patrick Rafter was the defending champion and defended his title defeating Andrei Pavel 3–6, 7–6(9–7), 6–4 in the final.

Seeds

Draw

Finals

Top half

Bottom half

References

 Main Draw

Rosmalen Grass Court Championships
1999 ATP Tour